Pontardawe railway station was a railway station on the Swansea Vale Railway that ran along the River Tawe. British Railways closed the station to passengers in 1950. The line continued carrying coal but with the decline in coal mining the station closed completely in 1965.

Present day
It was sited next to the Pontardawe Inn, known as the Gwachel, and the Victorian bridge over the Tawe.
Despite being called Pontardawe railway station, it was actually located in Alltwen as it lies south east of the river Tawe, which is the border line between the village of Alltwen and the town of Pontardawe.

References 

Enjoy the nicest routes in English | RouteYou

External links 

Buildings and structures in Neath Port Talbot
Disused railway stations in Neath Port Talbot
Railway stations in Great Britain opened in 1860
Railway stations in Great Britain closed in 1950
Former Midland Railway stations